Seresht (also Romanized as Sereshṭ; also known as Sar-i-Shat) is a village in Chelo Rural District, Chelo District, Andika County, Khuzestan Province, Iran. At the 2006 census, its population was 252, in 36 families.

References 

Populated places in Andika County